Cerura erminea is a moth of the family Notodontidae, also known as the lesser puss moth or feline. It is found in Europe.

The length of the forewings is 30–38 mm for females and 25–30 mm for males. The moth flies from May to July depending on the location.

The larvae feed on willow and poplar.

External links

Fauna Europaea
Lepidoptera of Belgium
Lepiforum.de
Vlindernet.nl 

Notodontidae
Moths described in 1783
Moths of Europe
Taxa named by Eugenius Johann Christoph Esper